The Mysuru peta is an opulent formal turban, originally worn by the Kings of Mysore. It consists of a long strip of cloth such as silk or cotton, that is wound around the head. It may be decorated with a border of gold or silver lace and with ornamental metal pendants.

Since India became independent in 1947, the traditional Mysuru peta has become a symbol of the region's cultural heritage, worn for formal occasions and awarded to distinguished people as a sign of honour, often with a shawl.

Tradition 

Wadiyar dynasty rulers wore richly jewelled turbans of silk and gold-threaded lace (jari) to match colourful royal dress. Kings wore the traditional Mysuru peta during meetings of the royal court (Durbar), for public events such as during the Dassara religious festival and at parades for visiting dignitaries.

The Mysuru peta was also worn by the King's senior officials, such as the Prime Minister (dewan). Men attending the King's court were expected to wear the Mysuru peta with a long black coat and white trousers.

Present Day 

Mysuru peta turbans are worn as formal attire for events such as weddings, religious gatherings and award ceremonies, particularly in Mysuru and Kodagu.

Students and faculty of universities in Karnataka are encouraged to wear a Mysuru peta for the convocation ceremony, rather than the mortarboard inherited from India's colonial past.

References

Culture of Karnataka
Indian headgear
Kingdom of Mysore